Ireland participated in the Eurovision Song Contest 1969 in Madrid, Spain. The participating broadcaster, RTÉ, selected the entrant through a national final, which was won by Muriel Day. Joined by the Lindsays, they finished 7th place with 10 points in the final on 29 March 1969.

Before Eurovision

National final
The Irish national final was held on Sunday 16 February 1969 from the RTÉ studios in Dublin and was broadcast on RTÉ Television, and hosted by Brendan O'Reilly. The winning song was decided by 10 regional juries throughout Ireland.

Four of the performers had represented Ireland in the Eurovision Song Contest in the previous four years. Butch Moore was Ireland's first representative in 1965, where he sang "I'm Walking the Streets in the Rain" and finished 6th in Naples. Dickie Rock represented Ireland in 1966 where he sang "Come Back to Stay" and finished 4th in Luxembourg. Sean Dunphy flew the Irish flag in Vienna in 1967 singing "If I Could Choose", which was the runner-up to the UK's Sandie Shaw. And Pat McGeegan performed the Irish entry in 1968 at the Royal Albert Hall in London with the song "Chance of a Lifetime", which ended up in fourth place.

At Eurovision
Muriel Day and the Lindsays performed 5th at the beginning of the startfield and finished 7th with 10 points.

Voting

References

1969
Countries in the Eurovision Song Contest 1969
Eurovision
Eurovision